Janowiec Castle - a Renaissance castle built in between 1508 and 1526, on a steep Vistulan hillside in Janowiec (14,5 km south of Puławy), Lublin Voivodeship, in Poland.

History

The castle was most likely built by Mikołaj Firlej at the beginning of the sixteenth century and expanded by his son, Piotr, the Voivode of the Ruthenian Voivodeship. The bastion, used as a residence, was destroyed by the Swedish army in 1655 during The Deluge. Although the following owners of the castle did their very best to rebuild the castle, the castle never managed to regain its former glory. In 1928, an archaeologist, Leon Kozłowski had taken over the castle, but his plans to reconstruct the castle were stopped by the Second World War. After the Second World War, the castle was left in its former state, being one of many private castles. In 1975, the castle was bought by the Nadwiślańskie Museum in Kazimierz Dolny in Poland.

See also
 Castles in Poland

References

Buildings and structures completed in 1526
Puławy County
1526 establishments in Europe
16th-century establishments in Poland